Carlos Armando Gruezo Arboleda (born 19 April 1995) is an Ecuadorian professional footballer who plays as a midfielder for Major League Soccer club San Jose Earthquakes and the Ecuador national team. He is the son of Carlos Armando Gruezo Quiñónez.

He is described by FIFA's official website as "a technically adept holding midfielder and a precise passer of the ball".

Club career
Gruezo began his career with Independiente del Valle before joining Ecuadorian club Barcelona SC.

Gruezo went on trial for VfB Stuttgart in their pre season friendlies in South Africa. On 30 January 2014, he signed a four-year contract with Stuttgart. He scored his first goal for the club in a 4–1 victory over Freiburg on 28 November 2014, becoming the first Ecuadorian to score in the Bundesliga. In 2015 however, he lost his spot in the starting lineup and only had a few more appearances for Stuttgart.

He moved to FC Dallas on 23 January 2016.

On 2 July 2019, Gruezo returned to Germany, joining FC Augsburg on a five-year-deal.

On 31 January 2023, Gruezo returned to the United States, joining San Jose Earthquakes on a three-year deal.

International career
Gruezo played for the Ecuador U17 national team at the 2011 FIFA U-17 World Cup and at the 2013 South American Youth Championship.

He made his debut for the senior national team on 17 May 2014, coming in as a second-half substitute for Christian Noboa against the Netherlands. On 6 June, he was named in Ecuador's squad for the 2014 FIFA World Cup.

Personal life
In February 2019, Gruezo obtained a U.S. green card, which qualified him as a domestic player for MLS roster purposes.

Career statistics

Club

International
Scores and results list Ecuador's goal tally first, score column indicates score after each Gruezo goal.

Honours
Barcelona S.C.
Serie A de Ecuador: 2012

FC Dallas
US Open Cup: 2016
Supporters' Shield: 2016

References

External links
 
 

1995 births
Living people
People from Santo Domingo de los Colorados
Association football midfielders
Ecuadorian footballers
Ecuador international footballers
2014 FIFA World Cup players
Copa América Centenario players
2019 Copa América players
2021 Copa América players
C.S.D. Independiente del Valle footballers
Barcelona S.C. footballers
VfB Stuttgart players
FC Dallas players
FC Augsburg players
San Jose Earthquakes players
Bundesliga players
Ecuadorian expatriate footballers
Expatriate footballers in Germany
Designated Players (MLS)
Major League Soccer players
Expatriate soccer players in the United States
Ecuadorian expatriate sportspeople in Germany
Ecuadorian expatriate sportspeople in the United States
2022 FIFA World Cup players